Rémy Duterte (born 19 April 1994) is a French professional footballer who plays as a left-back for Laval.

Career
Duterte began his career with the reserves of Valenciennes in 2012. On 4 August 2014 he transferred to Boulogne. He transferred to Laval on 22 June 2021, after 7 seasons with Boulogne. He helped Laval win the 2021–22 Championnat National and achieved promotion into the Ligue 2 for the 2022-23 season. He made his professional debut with Laval in a 2–1 Ligue 2 loss to EA Guingamp on 6 August 2022.

Honours
Laval
Championnat National: 2021–22

References

External links
 

1994 births
Living people
Sportspeople from Pas-de-Calais
French footballers
Valenciennes FC players
US Boulogne players
Stade Lavallois players
Ligue 2 players
Championnat National players
Championnat National 2 players
Championnat National 3 players
Association football fullbacks